Kisecik Canyon, a.k.a. Saklı Cennet ("Hidden Heaven"), is a canyon in Mersin Province, Turkey.

The canyon is locally dubbed Saklı Cennet ("Hidden Heaven").

The road between Sarıkavak and the canyon is a popular hiking course. It is stabilized only descending about  downhill. Visitors reach a small pond, which is fed by a creek, a tributary of Berdan River in the canyon. The canyon is very narrow, with steep slopes. It takes about six hours to pass through the canyon by foot on a tough trail. The creek offers recreational outdoor activities like swimming and rafting.

References

Landforms of Mersin Province
Çamlıyayla District
Canyons and gorges of Turkey